Salkhad District is a district of the As-Suwayda Governorate in southern Syria. Administrative centre is the city of Salkhad. At the 2004 census, the   district had a population of 60,375.

Sub-districts
The district of Salkhad is divided into five sub-districts or nawāḥī (population as of 2004):

See also
List of populated places in as-Suwayda Governorate

References

 
Districts of as-Suwayda Governorate